The Statue of Jesus in Saidnaya, titled I Have Come to Save the World, is the tallest Jesus Christ statue in the Middle East, completed on 14 October 2013, which coincided with a religious holiday for Orthodox Christians who celebrate the feast day of the Protection of the Most Holy Virgin Mary. The figure is 12.3 metres (40ft) tall and stands on a base that brings its height to 32 metres.

Location 

Construction

The statue, created by the Armenian sculptor Artush Papoian, was the brainchild of Yury Gavrilov, a 49-year-old man from Moscow who runs an organization called St Paul & St George Foundation in London. The Foundation, which Samir Shakib El-Gabban directs, was previously named the Gavrilov Foundation, after Yury Gavrilov.

Priests, theologians from the Trinity Lavra of St. Sergius in Russia and Artush Papoian were part of the eight-year project started in 2005. By 2012, the statue which was assembled in Armenia was ready, but Syria was in civil war, causing the project's biggest delay.

Majority Sunni Muslims dominate the revolt, and jihadists make up some of the strongest fighting groups. Other Muslim groups along with the Christian minority have stood largely with Assad's government, or remained neutral, sometimes arming themselves to keep hard-line rebels out of their communities.

Churches have been vandalized and priests abducted by the rebels in Saidnaya and Maaloula. Therefore, the Syrian Army & Hezbollah launched a campaign to retake full control of the Qalamoun Mountains during the Battle of Qalamoun.

After securing the area, the statue was shipped from Armenia to Lebanon, then eventually reached Syria to be installed in October 2013.

See also
List of statues of Jesus
List of tallest statues

References 

Colossal statues of Jesus
Religious buildings and structures completed in 2013
Monuments and memorials in Syria
2013 establishments in Syria
Cultural depictions of Adam and Eve
Russia–Syria relations
Armenia–Syria relations